The European Journal of Information Systems is an interdisciplinary scientific journal, which offers a distinctive European perspective on the theory and practice of information systems.

The journal was established in 1991 and is an official journal of The Operational Research Society. The journal covers a diverse range of topics including technology, development, implementation, strategy, management, and policy related to the theory and practice of information systems.

According to the Journal Citation Reports, the journal has a 2019 impact factor of 2.600.

History 
The journal was co-founded in 1991 by Ray J. Paul (Brunel University and London School of Economics). The editor-in-chief is Pär Ågerfalk, Uppsala University.

See also 
 List of journals in systems science

References

External links 
 

Information systems journals
Bimonthly journals
English-language journals
Operational Research Society academic journals
Publications established in 1991